Surattha soudanensis is a moth in the  family Crambidae. It is found in Bahrain, Saudi Arabia, Sudan, the United Arab Emirates, Afghanistan and Iran.

References

Ancylolomiini
Moths described in 1919
Moths of Asia